Vaughn D. Corley (November 2, 1907 – November 18, 1977) was an American football coach.  He served as the head football coach at New Mexico College of Agriculture and Mechanic Arts—now known as New Mexico State University—from 1948 to 1950, compiling a record of 9–20.  Corley played football and ran track at Texas Technological College—now known as Texas Tech University.  He began his coaching career in 1929 at Las Cruces High School in Las Cruces, New Mexico.  Corley moved to New Mexico A&M as an assistant football coach in 1933 and coached the linemen there under head coach Jerry Hines until 1938.  He coached the line at the University of Oregon, from 1939 to 1942 and again from 1945 to 1946, and at the University of Arizona in 1947 before returning to Mexico A&M as head coach in 1948.  Corley also coached at the Saint Mary's Pre-Flight School during World War II.

Corley died on  November 18, 1977, at a hospital in Las Cruces.

Head coaching record

College

References

External links
 

1907 births
1977 deaths
Arizona Wildcats football coaches
New Mexico State Aggies athletic directors
New Mexico State Aggies football coaches
New Mexico State Aggies men's basketball coaches
New Mexico State Aggies track and field coaches
Oregon Ducks football coaches
Saint Mary's Pre-Flight Air Devils football coaches
Texas Tech Red Raiders football players
Texas Tech Red Raiders men's track and field athletes
High school football coaches in New Mexico
People from Hardeman County, Texas
People from Hill County, Texas
Sportspeople from Lubbock, Texas
Players of American football from Texas